Pobiedna may refer to the following places in Poland:
Pobiedna, Lower Silesian Voivodeship (south-west Poland)
Pobiedna, Masovian Voivodeship (east-central Poland)